Otto Glöckel (8 February 1874 in Pottendorf, Lower Austria – 23 July 1935 in Vienna) social-democratic politician and school-reformer during the First Austrian Republic. First Minister of Education during the First Austrian Republic from April 1919 to October 1920.

After training as a teacher, Glöckel started work as a teacher in Schmelz, Vienna. In 1894 he joined the Austrian Social Democratic Party.

Otto Glöckel's Achievements:

 Women were granted the right to enter university.
 Religious education was no longer compulsory ("Glöckel Erlass", 10th of April 1919)
 Schools started to be organized in a democratic way (introduction of form and school representatives (??))
 The first comprehensive schools were established in Austria

Glöckel developed a collaborative relationship with the Gesellschafts- und Wirtschaftsmuseum.

References

1874 births
1935 deaths
People from Baden District, Austria
Social Democratic Party of Austria politicians
Government ministers of Austria
Members of the Austrian House of Deputies (1907–1911)
Members of the Austrian House of Deputies (1911–1918)
Members of the Provisional National Assembly
Members of the Constituent National Assembly (Austria)
Members of the National Council (Austria)